Mahakam Stadium is the second-largest stadium in the city of Depok. It is home to Depok United and is still under construction.

Tournament

References

Sports venues in West Java
Football venues in West Java
Multi-purpose stadiums in West Java
Sports venues in Depok
Football venues in Depok
Multi-purpose stadiums in Depok
Buildings and structures in Depok
Buildings and structures in West Java